Laura K. Mackay  is an Australian immunologist and microbiologist, specialising in tissue-resident memory T cells and their involvement in skin immunity. She is a Laboratory lead at the Peter Doherty Institute for Infection and Immunity. Mackay is listed as an esteemed scientist in the Encyclopaedia of Australian Science and Innovation. Her research on tissue-resident memory T cells has been featured by the University of Melbourne. She has been interviewed by Science on diversity in STEM and ABC Radio National Science Show on the influence of science on public good.

Awards, honours and recognition 
 2016 – Tall Poppy Award from Australian Institute of Policy and Science
 2018 – Michelson Prize for Human Immunology and Vaccine Research
2019 – Gottschalk Medal
 2019 – Eureka Prize for Outstanding Early Career Researcher
 2019 – Frank Fenner Prize for Life Scientist of the Year
 2022 – Fellow of the Australian Academy of Health and Medical Sciences

Selected publications

References 

Australian women biologists
Women immunologists
Year of birth missing (living people)
Living people
Fellows of the Australian Academy of Health and Medical Sciences
Women microbiologists
Alumni of the University of Birmingham
Australian expatriates in England